lm_sensors (Linux-monitoring sensors) is a free open-source software-tool for Linux that provides tools and drivers for monitoring temperatures, voltage, humidity, and fans. It can also detect chassis intrusions.

Issues

During 2001/2004, the lm_sensors package was not recommended for use on IBM ThinkPads due to potential EEPROM corruption issues on some models when aggressively probing for I2C devices.  This has since been dealt with, and the separate README file dedicated to ThinkPads was removed in 2007.

In 2013, the  command of lm-sensors began disrupting the gamma correction settings of some laptop display screens. This occurs while it is probing the I2C/SMBus adapters for connected hardware monitoring devices. Probing of these devices was disabled by default.

See also 

 Computer fan control
 envsys on NetBSD
 hw.sensors on OpenBSD / DragonFly BSD
 I2C
 Intelligent Platform Management Interface (IPMI)
 Super I/O
 Embedded Controller
 Advanced Configuration and Power Interface (ACPI)
 System Management Bus (SMBus)

References

External links 
 
 https://web.archive.org/web/20120429233433/http://www.lm-sensors.org/
 HWMon, the new parent project of lm_sensors

Articles with underscores in the title
Free software programmed in C
Free system software
Software related to embedded Linux
System monitors